Talent Varieties is a country music talent show on American network television and radio in 1955 that featured performers hoping to achieve fame in the entertainment business.

The weekly ABC-TV program was a live half-hour summer replacement series hosted by Slim Wilson. Wilson introduced the amateur and professional talent, including music and comedy acts (many from the Ozarks); and his Tall Timber Trio, composed of Speedy Haworth (guitar), Bob White (upright bass) and Bryan "Doc" Martin (steel guitar) provided accompaniment. Auditions were handled by Bill Ring.  The Westport Kids appeared July 12, and Buck Griffin appeared August 2.

The show aired on Tuesday nights from June 28–November 1. Its original time slot was 7:30–8 p.m. Eastern Time, replacing Cavalcade of America, but moved to 10–10:30 p.m. in September to briefly replace Break the Bank.

ABC Radio simulcast the program under the name Talent Round-Up from 7:30 p.m., as well as carrying an additional half-hour until 8:30.

The program originated from the Jewell Theatre in Springfield, Missouri, home to ABC's Ozark Jubilee; and was produced and directed by the Jubilee's Bryan Bisney, who took over from Ring in September.

Notes

References 

 .
 .
Sachs, Bill "Folk Talent & Tunes" (May 28, 1955), The Billboard, p. 56
Sachs, Bill "Folk Talent & Tunes" (July 23, 1955), The Billboard, p. 93
Sachs, Bill "Folk Talent & Tunes" (October 1, 1955), The Billboard, p. 64

External links 
 

1950s American music television series
1955 American television series debuts
1955 American television series endings
American Broadcasting Company original programming
Black-and-white American television shows
Country music television series
English-language television shows
Talent shows